A Freezer centre is a name typically applied to supermarkets which specialise in selling frozen food. Most freezer centres are smaller than an average supermarket and generally sell less fresh produce while still selling its products at a lower price on par with a standard no-frills supermarket such as Aldi or Lidl. 

In the UK, the most common freezer centres are  Iceland, Heron Foods and farmfoods. The concept of freezer centres is not very common outside of the UK with Iceland only having a handful of stores outside of the UK. 

Food retailing